San Juan Guarita is a municipality in the Honduran department of Lempira.

San Juan Guarita is one of the smallest municipalities of the Honduran Lempira department. The best way to go to Guarita is via Santa Rosa de Copán-San Marcos de Ocotepeque-Cololaca-Guarita and it takes about 2.5 hours.

History 

In the census of 1887, it appears as "El Rodeo", of Guarita municipality. In the administration of Rafael Lopez Gutierrez, a decree was emitted to create the municipality on February 21, 1921. It was created with land that remained after its inhabitants sold the land to the "Ladinos" of Guarita. This caused problems to acquire the official land titles, and they decided to separate from Guarita. Between 1917 and 1919, the Amerindians tried to negotiate their land title, and this produced internal friction and disputes amongst Amerindians and Ladinos. Guarita became a city on February 26, 1934. Under the decree No 1187, the municipality of "San Juan Guarita". On July 4, 1929, the governor of Lempira department and the military chief laid out the boundaries of the municipality, including its villages. It had to be respected by both municipalities and its adjudged rights forcing them to take the correcting measures by the Legislative Power. it was subscribed in both municipalities. But the differences continued among the towns. In 1935, the people were able to get a legitimate copy of the land titles and therefore the relationships among the inhabitants of both municipalities were improved.

Geography 

San Juan Guarita is based on the half of a mountain. It is surrounded by pine and oak tree forests. Also the mountains and hills are very steep and irregular. The weather has changed from cool to warmer every year due to the Forest exploitation.

Boundaries 
Its boundaries are:
North : Guarita municipalities.
South : El Salvador.
East  : Guarita municipality.
West  : Valladolid municipality.

Surface Extents: 43 km²

Resources 

Due to its elevation from the sea level. San Juan Guarita provides the conditions for coffee plantation. Beans and Corn crops can not miss, since they are part of the culture in the whole country. As the rest of the department, San Juan Guarita has electricity and mobile communications services. Internet access is found in the mayor's office. In some houses, people sell gasoline and diesel fuel. There are several groceries stores.

Population 
Mestizos (Spanish/Amerindian mixed) are the majority in this municipality.
Population:this municipality had approximately 2,841 people in 2001. The INE used this figure to elaborate estimates, and the number of people in 2008 could be 2,994.
Villages: 5
Settlements: 25

Demographics
At the time of the 2013 Honduras census, San Juan Guarita municipality had a population of 2,650. Of these, 97.58% were Mestizo, 1.85% White, 0.34% Indigenous and 0.23% Black or Afro-Honduran.

Tourism 

The distance between San Juan Guarita and Guarita municipality is scarcely half hill. The road is in good conditions most of the year. The deviation is located about 20 km from Cololaca, taking a right. The left deviation leads to Tambla municipality. Its architectural features are the colonial and simple. If the visitor is looking for the stillness of rural areas, this is the place to go. It gets a lot of influence from Salvadoran television and radio networks. Some notable features are the landscapes of the surrounding mountains.

Local Holidays: "San Juan" day on June 24.

References

External links

Municipalities of Honduras